Ventris C. Gibson is an American government official serving as the director of the United States Mint. She previously served as deputy director of the Mint from October 2021 until her confirmation by the U.S. Senate.

Education 
Gibson attended the University of Maryland Global Campus.

Career 
Gibson began her career in the United States Navy. She later joined the United States Department of Veterans Affairs, serving as director of the Office of Human Resources Management from 1996 to 1998 and deputy assistant secretary for human resources management from 1998 to 2003. During her tenure, Gibson participated in an investigation into allegations of sexual harassment at the Fayetteville Veterans Administration Hospital. She served as chief human capital officer of the Federal Aviation Administration from 2003 to 2010.

In 2012 and 2013, Gibson worked as a consultant at North Highland. She later joined the National Labor Relations Board, serving as acting chief human capital officer in 2013 and director of administration until 2014. From 2014 to 2015, she served as associate deputy assistant secretary of the United States Department of Health and Human Services for human resources. She served as director of the District of Columbia Department of Human Resources from 2015 to 2021. In October 2021, Gibson joined the United States Mint as deputy director and acting director. Also in 2021, Gibson was elected as a fellow of the National Academy of Public Administration.

Biden administration
On December 13, 2021, President Joe Biden nominated Gibson to serve as permanent director of the mint.

On June 15, 2022, the United States Senate confirmed Gibson in a voice vote.

References 

Living people
United States Department of Veterans Affairs officials
Federal Aviation Administration personnel
United States Department of Health and Human Services officials
Biden administration personnel
Year of birth missing (living people)
Directors of the United States Mint